Juan Pérez (born 1932, date of death unknown) was a Chilean cyclist. He competed in the individual road race event at the 1956 Summer Olympics.

References

External links
 

1932 births
Year of death missing
Chilean male cyclists
Olympic cyclists of Chile
Cyclists at the 1956 Summer Olympics
Place of birth missing